Eunidia subtesselata is a species of beetle in the family Cerambycidae. It was described by Charles Joseph Gahan in 1909. It is known from Kenya, Ethiopia, and Somalia.

Subspecies
 Eunidia subtessellata fulgurata Aurivillius, 1911
 Eunidia subtessellata subtessellata Gahan, 1909

References

Eunidiini
Beetles described in 1909
Taxa named by Charles Joseph Gahan